This is a list of units of the British Army's Royal Electrical and Mechanical Engineers.

Division

Battalion

Workshop

References

Citations

Bibliography